Nobatia  or Nobadia (Greek: Νοβαδία, Nobadia; Old Nubian: ⲙⲓⲅⲛ̅ Migin or ⲙⲓⲅⲓⲧⲛ︦ ⲅⲟⲩⲗ, Migitin Goul lit. "of Nobadia's land") was a late antique kingdom in Lower Nubia. Together with the two other Nubian kingdoms, Makuria and Alodia, it succeeded the kingdom of Kush. After its establishment in around 400, Nobadia gradually expanded by defeating the Blemmyes in the north and incorporating the territory between the second and third Nile cataract in the south. In 543, it converted to Coptic Christianity. It would then be annexed by Makuria, under unknown circumstances, during the 7th century.

History

The kingdom of Nobatia had been founded in the former Meroitic province of Akine, which comprised large parts of Lower Nubia and is speculated to have been autonomous already before the ultimate fall of the Meroitic kingdom in the mid 4th century.  

While the Nobatae  had been invited into the region from the Western Desert by the Roman Emperor Diocletian already in 297 AD, their kingdom becomes tangible only in around 400 AD. Early Nobatia is quite likely the same civilization that is known to archeologists as the Ballana culture. 

Eventually, the Nobatae were successful in defeating the Blemmyes, and an inscription by Silko, "Basiliskos" of the Nobatae, claims to have driven the Blemmyes into the Eastern Desert. Around this time the Nobatian capital was established at Pakhoras (modern Faras); soon after, Nobatia converted to non-Chalcedonian Christianity.

By 707, Nobatia had been annexed to its southern neighbor, Makuria. The circumstances of this merger are unknown. It is also unknown what happened to the royal Nobadian family. The merger most likely occurred before the Muslim conquest in 652, since the Arab histories speak of only one Christian state in Nubia and reached at least as far as Old Dongola. Nobatia seems to have maintained some autonomy in the new state. It was ruled by an eparch of Nobatia who was also titled the Domestikos of Pakhoras. These were originally appointed but seem to be dynastic in the later period. Some of their records have been found at Fort Ibrim, presenting a figure with a great deal of power. 

Nobatia՚s name is often given as al-Maris in Arabic histories. The eparchate of Nobadia remained an integral part of the kingdom of Makuria until the very end, as is confirmed by a document from 1463 mentioning an eparch named Teedderre.

Religion

Paganism
Since Ptolemaic times, the "state religion" of Lower Nubia had been the Isis cult of Philae. Its importance outlived the Ptolemaic and Meroitic period and Nubian pilgrims continued to travel to Philae. The temple on Philae was eventually shut down in 535-538 and Nubians were forbidden to enter it.
Another Isis cult, the Greco-Roman mysteries of Isis, has been confirmed to be practised in Nobadia by an unearthed shrine in Qasr Ibrim. This cult was practised during Meroitic times as well.

Christianity

As confirmed by epigraphical and archaeological evidence, Christianity was already present among parts of the Nobadian society even before the official conversion of 543. The Nobadian elite might have started considering to convert to Christianity in the 530s, paralleling to when the Isis temple was shut down. Christianity proceeded to spread through Nobadia on various levels at different speeds. Towns, for example, were quick in adopting the new religion, while the Christianization of the villages was not accomplished until the 7th-9th centuries. South of the second cataract, Christianity seems to have begun spreading later than in the north, possibly since the late 6th or early 7th century. Many ancient Egyptian temples were converted to churches and plastered with Christian wall paintings.

Military culture

Nothing is known about the organization of the Nobatian army. Many of the weapons employed by the Nobatians had antecedents from the Meroitic period.

Missile weapons

Archaeology from the pagan period confirms the relevance archery had for the Nubians and therefore also the Nobatians. The slightly reflexed longsbows, which are attested for Kushite mercenaries since the Middle Kingdom, were replaced by reflex composite bows during the Meroitic or post-Meroitic period, measuring around one meter and originally designed to be shot from horseback. One simple wooden self bow is known from an early Nobadian burial in Qustul. The Nobadians shot barbed and possibly poisoned arrows of around 50 cm length. To store the arrows, they used quivers made of tanned leather originally from long-necked animals like goats or gazelles. Additionally, they were enhanced with straps, flaps and elaborate decoration. The quivers were possibly worn not in the back, but in the front. On the hand holding the bow, the archers wore bracelets to protect the hand from injuries while drawing the bowstring. For the nobility, the bracelets could be made of silver, while poorer versions were made of rawhide. Furthermore, the archers wore thumb rings, measuring between three and four cm. Thus, Nubian archers would have employed a drawing technique very similar to the Persian and Chinese one, both of which also reliant on thumb rings.

At Qasr Ibrim, two crossbow darts have been discovered. The use of crossbows had hitherto been unattested in Nubia.

Melee weapons

A weapon characteristic for the Nobadians was a type of short sword. It has a straight hollow-ground blade which was sharpened only on one edge and was therefore not designed to thrust, but to hack. Apart of said swords, there were also lances, some of them with large blades, as well as halberds. The large-bladed lances and the halberds were possibly only ceremonial.

Body protection
Nobadian warriors and their leadership made use of shields and body armour, most of it manufactured from leather. Fragments of thick hide have been found in the royal tombs of Qustul, suggesting that the principal interment was usually buried while wearing armour. A well-preserved and richly decorated breastplate made of oxhide comes from Qasr Ibrim, while a comparable, but more fragmentary piece was discovered at Gebel Adda, albeit this one was made of reptile hide, possibly from a crocodile. Another fragment which possibly once constituted a body armour comes from Qustul. It consists of several layers of tanned leather and was studded with lead rosettes.

Notes

References

Further reading

History of Nubia
History of Sudan
Kingdom of Makuria
Christianity in Sudan
Countries in ancient Africa
Former countries in Africa
States and territories established in the 4th century
7th-century disestablishments in Africa
States and territories disestablished in the 7th century
Christianity in the Middle Ages
Coptic Orthodox Church
Blemmyes
Former kingdoms